Lambda Alpha is the National Collegiate Honors Society for Anthropology, founded in 1969 at Wichita State University.

History

As of 2011, there were 170 chapters of record. The organization offers annual scholarships to students of anthropology as well as an annual magazine, half of which is reserved for student publications that pass a peer review process.

National Officers 

The National Executive Secretary for Lambda Alpha is Dr. Benjamin. K. Swartz, Jr., Professor Emeritus of Anthropology, Ball State University.

References

Anthropology